The Akai S3000XL is a sampler with 32 polyphonic voices, and 2 MB of built-in RAM.

For adding sounds to the sampler, the S3000XL features a 3.5" floppy drive that reads Akai-formatted floppies, and a SCSI port which allows for connection to an external storage device (such as a zip drive or external hard disk), a CD reader, or a computer for editing samples via the MESA editor. The device can also play back MIDI files, which is useful during live performances, as the Akai can take the role of the computer to trigger internal samples or external MIDI devices. The built-in 2 MB of RAM can be upgraded up to 32 using 2 16 MB SIMMs that Akai provided; other upgrades include cards such as the EB-16 effects board and the IB-304f filter board.

The S3000XL has 8 outputs, and two 1/4" phone connector inputs, which meant that it could also operate as a hard disk recorder. The front panel consists of 32 buttons (eight of which are function keys), three knobs, and a four-key directional pad for navigating the 240×64 display, which is located in the upper-middle portion of the sampler.

It is one of the most versatile and useful samplers produced, primarily due to the large screen and easy-to-navigate interface allowing for quick and in-depth sample editing. However, the LCD screen's backlight fades easily and the memory capacity is comparatively small by today's standards.

The S2000 is a stripped down budget version of the S3000XL featuring a smaller 2×16 character LCD display and no internal SCSI connector; it was usually sold with no options installed. Regardless, it is functionally similar and accepts the S3000XL options listed below (sans internal hard disk), including the IB-208P 8-channel output board, which is exclusive to the S2000.

Although Akai has discontinued production and product support for the S3000XL, many working units can still be found in recording studios around the world.

Options
Akai EB16 "SampleVerb" 4 × 50 effects board
Akai FMX008 8MB Non-Volatile Flash ROM
Akai IB304f "ProFilter" filter board
Akai MESA editor
Akai OS v2.0
Akai SHD524 524MB 2.5" SCSI Hard Disk

References

Further reading

External links
 Akai S-Series
 S3000XL features
 S3000XL more info

Samplers (musical instrument)
S3000XL
Japanese brands
1996 introductions